Oliver Makor (born 9 October 1973) is a Liberian former professional footballer who played as a midfielder. Over his career, he played for Persik Kediri, Proodeftiki FC, Egaleo FC and Ionikos FC, among others.

Makor was also a member of the Liberia national football team.

External links 
 
 Oliver Makor profile - www.liberiansoccer.com
 Oliver Makor profile - www.zerozero.eu
 

1973 births
Living people
Liberian footballers
Liberian expatriate footballers
Liberia international footballers
Association football midfielders
Expatriate footballers in Greece
Grenoble Foot 38 players
Monrovia Black Star FC players
Tours FC players
Limoges FC players
Proodeftiki F.C. players
Ionikos F.C. players
Canon Yaoundé players
Persik Kediri players
Persija Jakarta players
Liga 1 (Indonesia) players
Super League Greece players
Expatriate footballers in France
Expatriate footballers in Cameroon
Expatriate footballers in Indonesia
Egaleo F.C. players
1996 African Cup of Nations players
2002 African Cup of Nations players
Sportspeople from Monrovia